Absurda (also titled Scissors) is a short film directed by David Lynch and shown at the 2007 Cannes Film Festival as an opening short to Wong Kar-wai’s film My Blueberry Nights. The film is approximately two and a half minutes long. It employs dream-like imagery, with stationary visuals which show a theater and the screen on which nightmarish images are projected. The film is part of the To Each His Own Cinema anthology. Lynch re-released the film on his YouTube channel in 2020.

Synopsis 
Four people (never seen, but heard) enter a theater, expecting to see a film about dancing, but only see a large pair of scissors sticking out of the screen. They are then shown images of a woman in a pink dress and ballet shoes, who the group identifies as one of them, Cindy, and a man with a bloody face, who the group identifies as another of them, Tom. The projectionist explains that the scissors are "what was used" and that Tom is "the one who did it". Tom denies that he is the one on screen. The scissors reappear in a stabbing motion as Cindy becomes distressed by the way Tom is looking at her. A commotion and Cindy's screams then accompany the theater being engulfed in smoke as the others shout at Tom to "stop". Cindy then reappears on the screen, dancing ballet, as her voice says "So, I went dancing. I've always loved to dance."

References

External links
 
 David Lynch's website

American avant-garde and experimental films
2007 films
Short films directed by David Lynch
American short films
2000s avant-garde and experimental films
2000s English-language films
2000s American films